Norman Edwin Himes (1899–1949) was an American sociologist and economist and Professor at Colgate University, known for his work on the medical history of contraception.<ref>Wajcman, Judy. Feminism confronts technology. John Wiley & Sons, 2013.</ref>

Himes obtained his PhD from Harvard University in 1932. After graduation, he started his academic career at Colgate University in 1932. In World War II he served at the Surgeon General of the United States. His research interests were in the field of "population problems, history of contraception and the birth control movement, and marriage and family relations."

 Selected publications The Truth about Birth Control: With a Bibliography of Birth Control Literature, John Day (1932)
 Himes, Norman Edwin, and Christopher Tietze. Medical history of contraception. Vol. 657. New York: Gamut Press, 1936, 1963.
 Himes, Norman Edwin, and Donald Lavor Taylor. Your marriage. Rinehart, 1955.

Selected articles
 Himes, Norman E. "The place of John Stuart Mill and of Robert Owen in the history of English neo-Malthusianism." The Quarterly Journal of Economics (1928): 627–640.
 Himes, Norman E. "Essays on population and other papers by James Alfred Field, together with material from his notes and lectures compiled and edited by Helen Fisher Hohman, with a foreword by James Bonar, LL. D." The Eugenics Review 23.3 (1931): 258-261: On the work of James A. Field.
 Himes, Norman E. "Birth control in historical and clinical perspective." The Annals of the American Academy of Political and Social Science'' (1932): 49–65.

References

External links 
 Norman E. Himes papers, 1918-1956 (inclusive), 1925-1950 (bulk). B MS c77. Boston Medical Library, Francis A. Countway Library of Medicine, Boston, Mass.

1899 births
1949 deaths
Economists from New York (state)
American sociologists
Harvard University alumni
Colgate University faculty
20th-century American economists